Boisberg is an unincorporated community in Monson Township, Traverse County, in the U.S. state of Minnesota.

History
Boisberg derives its name from the nearby Bois de Sioux River.

References

Unincorporated communities in Traverse County, Minnesota
Unincorporated communities in Minnesota